Zinc transporter proteins (Zrt), or simply zinc transporters, are membrane transport proteins of the solute carrier family which control the membrane transport of zinc and regulate its intracellular and cytoplasmic concentrations. They include two major groups: (1) the zinc transporter (ZnT) or solute carrier 30 (SLC30) family, which controls the efflux of zinc from the cytoplasm out of the cell and from the cytoplasm into vesicles; and (2) the zinc importer, Zrt- and Irt-like protein (ZIP), or solute carrier 39A (SLC39A) family, which controls the influx of zinc into the cytoplasm from outside the cell and from vesicles.

At least one zinc transporter, ZIP9, is also a G protein-coupled receptor and membrane androgen receptor.

Families

ZnT (SLC30)

Members: ZnT1, ZnT2, ZnT3, ZnT4, ZnT5, ZnT6, ZnT7, ZnT8, ZnT9, ZnT10

Bacterial members of the family are known to increase tolerance to high salt concentrations.

ZntB Zinc Transporter Protein 
Unlike some other zinc transporter proteins, the mechanism of how Zn2+ is transported via ZntB is not well understood. However, scientists have been able to speculate that the transport of Zn2+ is related to pH gradient and the electrostatics of the protein membrane.

ZIP (SLC39)

ZIP1, ZIP2, ZIP3, ZIP4, ZIP5, ZIP6, ZIP7 (Catsup), ZIP8, ZIP9, ZIP10, ZIP11, ZIP12, ZIP13, ZIP14

The structure of a bacterial ZIP protein has been resolved.

References 

Solute carrier family